Acrolophus acornus is a moth of the family Acrolophidae. It is found in Arizona.

References

Moths described in 1964
acornus